Mole, pronounced , from Nahuatl mōlli, meaning "sauce", is a traditional sauce and marinade originally used in Mexican cuisine. In contemporary Mexico the term is used for a number of sauces, some quite dissimilar, including mole amarillo or amarillito (yellow mole), mole chichilo, mole colorado or coloradito (reddish mole), mole manchamantel or manchamanteles (tablecloth stainer), mole negro (black mole), mole rojo (red mole), mole verde (green mole), mole poblano, mole almendrado (mole with almond), mole michoacano, mole prieto, mole ranchero, mole tamaulipeco, mole xiqueno,  mole pipián (mole with squash seed), mole rosa (pink mole), mole blanco (white mole), chimole, guacamole (mole with avocado) and huaxmole (mole with huaje).

Generally, a mole sauce contains fruits, nuts, chili peppers, and spices like black pepper, cinnamon, or cumin.

While not moles in the classic sense, there are some dishes that use the term in their name. Mole de olla is a stew made from beef and vegetables, which contains guajillo and ancho chili, as well as a number of other ingredients found in moles.

History

Two states in Mexico claim to be the origin of mole: Puebla and Oaxaca. The best-known moles are native to these two states, but other regions in Mexico also make various types of mole sauces.

Moles come in various flavors and ingredients, with chili peppers as the common ingredient. The classic mole version is the variety called mole poblano, which is a dark red or brown sauce served over meat. The dish has become a culinary symbol of Mexico's mestizaje, or mixed indigenous and European heritage, both for the types of ingredients it contains and because of the legends surrounding its origin.

A common legend of its creation takes place at the Convent of Santa Clara in Puebla early in the colonial period. Upon hearing that the archbishop was going to visit, the convent nuns panicked because they were poor and had almost nothing to prepare. The nuns prayed and brought together the little bits of what they did have, including nuts, chili peppers, spices, day-old bread and a little chocolate. They killed an old turkey, cooked it and put the sauce on top; the archbishop loved it. When one of the nuns was asked the name of the dish, she replied, "I made a mole." Mole is an archaic word for mix; now this word mostly refers to the dish, and is rarely used to signify other kinds of mixes in Spanish.

A similar version of the story says that monk Fray Pascual invented the dish, again to serve the archbishop of Puebla. In this version, spice were knocked over or blown over into pots in which chicken were cooking. Other versions of the story substitute the viceroy of New Spain, such as Juan de Palafox y Mendoza in place of the archbishop.

Modern mole is a mixture of ingredients from North America, Europe, Africa, and Asia making it one of the first intercontinental dishes created in the Americas. Its base, however, is indigenous. Nahuatl speakers had a preparation they called mōlli or chīlmōlli, meaning "chili sauce". In the book General History of the Things of New Spain, Bernardino de Sahagún says that mollis were used in a number of dishes, including those for fish, game and vegetables. Theories about the origins of mole have supposed that it was something imposed upon the natives or that it was the product of the baroque artistry of Puebla, but there is not enough evidence for definitive answers.

While a vast myriad of mole existed throughout prehispanic Mesoamerica, the Mexica primarily reserved the use of chocolate for beverages. In the writings of Sahagún, there is no mention of it being used to flavor dishes. Most likely what occurred was a gradual modification of the original molli sauce, adding more and different ingredients depending on the location. This diversified the resulting sauces into various types. Ingredients that have been added into moles include nut (such as almond, peanut, pine nut), seed (such as sesame seed,  squash seed), cilantro, seedless grape, plantain, garlic, onion, cinnamon, and chocolate. However, most versions do not contain cinnamon. What remained the same was the use of chili peppers, especially ancho, pasilla, mulato and chipotle, and the consistency of the sauce. The true story of how mole developed may never be truly known, as the first recipes did not appear until after the Mexican War of Independence in 1810. The Nahuatl etymology of the name probably indicates a Mesoamerican origin.

Preparation and consumption

All mole preparations begin with one or more types of chili pepper. The classic moles of Central Mexico and Oaxaca, such as mole poblano and mole negro, include two or more of the following types of chili pepper: ancho, pasilla, mulato and chipotle. Other ingredients can include black pepper, achiote, huaje, cumin, clove, anise, tomato, tomatillo, garlic, sesame seed, dried fruit, herb like hoja santa, and many other ingredients. Mole poblano has an average of 20 ingredients; mole almendrado has an average of 26, and Oaxacan moles can have over 30. Chocolate, if used, is added at the end of cooking. According to Rick Bayless, the ingredients of mole can be grouped into five distinct classes: hot (chili), sour (tomatillo), sweet (fruit and sugar), spice and thick (seed, nut, tortilla).

The ingredients are roasted and ground into a fine powder or paste. This roasting and grinding process is extremely laborious and takes at least a day to accomplish by hand. Traditionally, this work was shared by several generations of women in the family, but after the arrival of electric mills, it became more common to take the ingredients to be ground. Many families have their own varieties of mole passed down for generations, with their preparation reserved for special events in large batches.

The resulting powder or paste is mixed with water, or more often broth, and simmered until it is pungent and very thick. It is most often prepared in a cazuela or a thick heavy clay cauldron and stirred almost constantly to prevent burning. The thickness of the sauce has prompted some, such as Mexican-food authority Patricia Quintana, to claim it is too substantial to be called a sauce. However, like a sauce, it is always served over something and never eaten alone. Mole poblano is most traditionally served with turkey, but it and many others are also served with chicken, pork, or other meat (such as lamb).

A number of mole powders and pastes can be prepared ahead of time and sold, such as mole poblano, mole negro, and mole colorado. Many markets in Mexico, as well as grocery stores, supermarkets, and online retailers internationally, sell mole pastes and powders in packages or by the kilogram.

Prepared mole sauce will keep for about three days in the refrigerator and it freezes well. The paste will keep six months in the refrigerator and about a year in the freezer. Leftover sauce is often used for the making of tamale and enchilada (often called enmolada) or over egg at brunch.

Varieties

Mexico

Oaxaca
Oaxaca has been called "the land of the seven moles".  Its large size, mountainous terrain, variety of indigenous peoples, and many microclimates make for numerous regional variations in its food.  From this has come moles amarillo, chichilo, colorado, manchamantel, negro, rojo and verde, all differently colored and flavored, based on the use of distinctive chilis and herbs. The last, a chicken and fruit stew, is questioned by some such as Susan Trilling in her book My Search for the Seventh Mole: A Story with Recipes from Oaxaca, Mexico, whether it is a true mole. In addition, those from Puebla claim this dish as their own.

Mole colorado is also popular, often simplified and sold as an enchilada sauce. The best known of Oaxaca's moles is mole negro, which is darker than mole poblano and also includes chocolate, chili peppers, onions, garlic, and more. Its distinguishing ingredient is the leaf of the hoja santa. It is the most complex and difficult to make of the sauces. Mole verde must be made fresh with herbs and not from a mix, as they require a number of fresh herb, other ingredients includes green chili pepper, squash seed and more.

Puebla

Mole poblano is perhaps the best known of all mole varieties. An ancient dish native to the state of Puebla, it has been called the national dish of Mexico, and ranked first as the most typical of Mexican dishes.

Mole poblano contains about 20 ingredients, including sugar and cocoa, but for practicality and simplicity, chocolate is also used, which works to counteract the heat of the chili peppers, but its flavor does not dominate. It helps reinforce the sauce's dark color provided by mulato pepper. This sauce is most often served over turkey, a meat native to Mexico, at weddings, birthdays and baptisms, or at Christmas with romeritos over shrimp cakes. Even though the holiday is not much recognized elsewhere in Mexico, mole is prominent in Puebla on Cinco de Mayo, where it is a major celebration.

San Pedro Atocpan, Mexico City
San Pedro Atocpan is an agricultural community in the mountains south of Mexico City. Until the mid-20th century it was similar to those surrounding it, growing corn, fava bean and nopal (prickly pear cactus). Electricity and other modern conveniences were slow to arrive, allowing the community to retain more of its traditions longer.
In 1940, Father Damian Sartes San Roman came to the parish of San Pedro Atocpan and saw the potential in marketing mole to raise living standards in the area. At that time, only four neighborhoods prepared mole for town festivals: Panchimalco, Ocotitla, Nuztla and Tula, but those who prepared it were generally prominent women in their communities. In the 1940s, one family made the long trek to Mexico City proper to sell some of their mole at the La Merced Market. It was successful, but they brought with them only two kilograms since it was made by hand grinding the ingredients on a metate. The arrival of electricity in the late 1940s made the use of a powered mill possible, and better roads made the trek to the city easier. Some of these mills were bought or financed by Father Sartes, but the mole was still cooked in a clay pot over a wood fire. In the 1970s, he was part of a small group which became a cooperative, which constructed the Las Cazuelas restaurant. This is where the first Mole Exhibition was held in 1978.

The care and tradition that went into the moles from there made them popular and made the town famous in the Mexico City area. Today, San Pedro Atocpan produces 60% of the moles consumed in Mexico and 89% of the moles consumed in Mexico City, with a total estimated production of between 28,000 and 30,000 tons each year. Ninety-two percent of the town's population makes a living preparing mole powders and pastes, all in family businesses. Prices for mole run between 80 and 160 pesos per kilogram, depending on the maker and the type. A number of moles are made in the town, but mole almendrado is signature to the area. Producers in Atocpan have their own versions of the various types of mole, often keeping recipes strictly secret. The production in the town has become very competitive, especially in quality. Twenty-two brands are permitted to print "Made in San Pedro Atocpan" on their labels.

Other

Various types of mole sauces can be found throughout the center of Mexico toward the south. There is the mole michoacan from Michoacan, mole prieto from Tlaxcala, mole ranchero from Morelos, mole tamaulipeco from Tamaulipas, mole xiqueño from Xico, Veracruz and more.

Mole verde from Veracruz, where pork is covered in a sauce made from ground peanut, tomatillo, cilantro and more.

Mole pipián is a type of mole which mostly consists of ground squash seeds. It generally contains tomatillo, hoja santa, chili pepper, garlic and onion to give it a green hue. There is also a red version, which combines the squash seed with peanut, red jalapeño or chipotle, and sesame seed. Like other moles, it is cooked with broth and then served with poultry and pork, or sometimes with fish and vegetable.

Mole rosa from Taxco, Guerrero, the spiciness of this version is very mild.

Chimole is also known as "Black Dinner" because of its dark appearance and is common in Yucatan, Mexico and Belize. Ingredients include spices and some black recado (achiote paste, a blend of spices commonly used in Maya cuisine) in block pieces. This dish was first known by Yucatec Maya, but because of the Belize's vast cultural diversity, most Belizeans are making it in their homes and for special occasions. The dish can be served with hot boiled egg, corn tortilla, rice or just by itself.

Guacamole, from āhuacamōlli, which literally translates to "avocado sauce", from āhuacatl, meaning "avocado" + mōlli.

Huaxmole is a mole sauce variation, which is soupy and often served over goat meat (cabrito).

Guatemala 
Mole guatemalteco is a dessert sauce made from dried chili, tomato and squash seed. It is often poured over fried plantain, and served with sesame seed on top.

Popularity

Mole is one of the most representative dishes of Mexico, especially for major celebrations. Ninety-nine percent of Mexicans have tried at least one type of mole. The dish enjoys its greatest popularity in central and southern Mexico, but simpler versions of mole poblano did make their way north. However, northern versions are far less complex and generally used to make enchiladas.

The consumption of mole is strongly associated with celebrations. In Mexico, to say "to go to a mole" means to go to a wedding. Mole has a strong flavor, especially the dark ones and is considered to be an acquired taste for most. This has spawned another saying, "(estar) en su mero mole", which means something like "one's cup of tea".

To promote their regional versions of the sauce, a number of places host festivals dedicated to it. The Feria Nacional del Mole (National Festival of Mole) was begun in 1977 in San Pedro Atocpan, and is held each year in October. It began outside the town, in the small community of Yenhuitlalpan, in May. The four restaurants there decided to take advantage of the festival of the Señor de las Misericordias (Lord of the Mercies) to promote their moles. Despite their success, a number in the village did not like that they were using a religious festival for commercial ends, so a separate mole festival was created for October.  Today, 37 restaurants and mole producers participate in the event. The most popular variety is the mole almendrado. Originally, the October version of the fair was held in the town proper, but after it became too big, it was moved to prepared fairgrounds outside along the highway.

The city of Puebla also holds an annual mole festival, whose proceeds are shared among the Santa Rosa, Santa Inés and Santa Catarina convents. The world's record for the largest pot of mole was broken at the city's 2005 festival. The pot was 1.4 meters in diameter at the base, 1.9 meters high, with a diameter of 2.5 meters at the top. Four hundred people participated in its preparation, using 800 kilos of mole paste, 2,500 kilos of chicken, 500 kilos of tortilla and 1,600 kilos of broth. The resulting food fed 11,000 people.

The women of Santa María Magdalena in Querétaro have been locally known for their mole for about 100 years. In 1993, they decided to hold a contest for the best mole.  This was the beginning of the Feria del Mole y Tortilla (Mole and Tortilla Festival), which has been held every year since then. It still features a mole cook-off and attracts hundreds of visitors from the state. The community of Coatepec de Morelos in the municipality of Zitácuaro, Michoacán, holds an annual Feria de Mole in April.

Mole has become a popular and widely available prepared food product in the United States. Several brands of mole paste are available in the United States and can be found online. Chicago has an annual mole festival for Mexican immigrants at the Universidad Popular community center. The event is a cooking contest, which had over 40 entries, with the winner taking away US$500.

See also

 List of Mexican dishes

References

External links

 El mole en la ruta de los dioses Comprehensive report on mole from CONACULTA

Oaxacan cuisine
Mesoamerican cuisine
Mexican sauces
Guatemalan cuisine